Eastbourne is a constituency for the House of Commons of the UK Parliament. It was created as one of nine in Sussex in 1885, since when it has reduced in geographic size reflecting the growth of its main settlement, Eastbourne.

The seat was re-won in 2019 by Caroline Ansell, a Conservative who ousted Liberal Democrat Stephen Lloyd; she earlier did so in 2015. Since the seat's creation it has been won by candidates from either of these two political parties (and their early forebears, the Liberal Party and the Unionist Party).  The seat has had four by-elections, lastly in 1990.

For 94 years of the 20th Century, the seat was represented by Conservative MPs. The seat in the 1930s saw three unopposed candidates: in 1932, March 1935 and November 1935. Eastbourne has been considered relative to others a very marginal seat, as well as a swing seat, since 1997 as its winner's majority has been at most 7.86% of the vote. A 8.9% majority Tory re-gain took place in 1992 and since 2010 the seat has changed hands (between the two parties mentioned) all four possible times.

Members of Parliament

Constituency profile 

The constituency contains urban and suburban developments, including the whole of the Eastbourne Borough Council administrative area, as well as the village of Willingdon on its outskirts, which forms a small part of the Wealden District Council administrative area.

Eastbourne itself is on the edge of the London Commuter Belt and is a coastal resort town. The Eastbourne seat has narrowed at every Boundary Commission Periodic Review, as the population of the core town has grown.

Chris Hanretty, the Professor of Politics at Royal Holloway, estimated that Eastbourne voted 57.6% to 42.4% in favour of leaving the European Union during the 2016 referendum.

History

Origin 

This seat was created by the Redistribution of Seats Act 1885. This zone had been in the East Sussex constituency, which in turn had been created with two seats by the Reform Act 1832 as a division of the 13th century-founded Sussex parliamentary county which had two seats (returned two knights of the shire).

Boundaries 

1885–1918: The Corporate Towns of Pevensey and Seaford, the Sessional Divisions of Hailsham and Uckfield (except the parishes of East Hoathly and Waldron), and part of the Sessional Division of Lewes.

1918–1950: The Borough of Eastbourne, the Rural District of Eastbourne, and in the Rural District of Hailsham the parishes of Arlington, Chalvington, Chiddingly, Hailsham, Hellingly, Laughton, and Ripe.

1950–1955: The Boroughs of Eastbourne and Bexhill, and in the Rural District of Hailsham the parishes of East Dean, Friston, Hooe, Jevington, Ninfield, Pevensey, Polegate, Wartling, Westham, and Willingdon.

1955–1974: The Borough of Eastbourne, and part of the Rural District of Hailsham.

1974–1983: The Borough of Eastbourne, and in the Rural District of Hailsham the parishes of East Dean, Friston, Jevington, Pevensey, Polegate, Westdean, Westham, and Willingdon.

1983–1997: The Borough of Eastbourne, and the District of Wealden wards of Polegate North, Polegate South, and Willingdon.

1997–2010: As prior, substituting East Dean for the Polegate wards.

2010–present: As prior, less East Dean.

From safe seat to marginal seat 

From 1910 until 1987 the seat returned Conservative Party candidates at every election. The large rural vote within the seat, until boundary changes in 1983, resulted in strong Conservative support – rural English voters tended to be richer and more right-wing (anti-socialist, pro-Empire before 1960s, pro-Established Church and pro-defence) compared to other voters.

The seat became a marginal, or swing seat, from the 1990 by-election onwards, being closely fought for between the two locally dominant parties. A Liberal Democrat gained the seat at the 2010 general election, in a vote which saw Eastbourne return the sixth-lowest Labour share of the vote of the 631 candidates who stood at the election, with only 4.8%. In 2015, the seat was the 9th most marginal of the Conservative Party's 331 seats, by share of the vote.

By-elections 

 1925 Eastbourne by-election (Con, hold), following the resignation of the Conservative MP Sir George Ambrose Lloyd
 1932 Eastbourne by-election (Con, hold), following the death of the Conservative MP Edward Marjoribanks
 1935 Eastbourne by-election (Con, hold), following the death of the Conservative MP John Slater
 1990 Eastbourne by-election (LD, gain), following the assassination of the Conservative MP Ian Gow by members of the Provisional IRA.

Election results by decade

Elections in the 2010s

Elections in the 2000s

Elections in the 1990s 

This constituency underwent boundary changes between the 1992 and 1997 general elections and thus change in share of vote is based on a notional calculation.

Elections in the 1980s

Elections in the 1970s

Elections in the 1960s

Elections in the 1950s

Election in the 1940s

Elections in the 1930s

Elections in the 1920s

Elections in the 1910s 

General Election 1914–15:

Another General Election was required to take place before the end of 1915. The political parties had been making preparations for an election to take place and by July 1914, the following candidates had been selected;
Unionist: Rupert Gwynne
Liberal:

Elections in the 1900s

Elections in the 1890s

Elections in the 1880s

See also 
List of parliamentary constituencies in East Sussex
Boundary Commissions (United Kingdom)
Sixth Periodic Review of Westminster constituencies

Notes

References

Sources 
Election result, 2005 (BBC)
Election results, 1997–2001 (BBC)
Election results, 1997–2001 (Election Demon)
Election results, 1983–1992
Election results, 1992–2005 (Guardian)
Election results, 1950–2001 (Keele University)

 

Parliamentary constituencies in South East England
Politics of Eastbourne
Constituencies of the Parliament of the United Kingdom established in 1885